Jake Maskall (born 1971 in England) is an English television, film and theatre actor.

Career
Jake has guest starred in Casualty as Paul Vessey and Scobie in Murder City.

Jake's most notable role came in the BBC television soap opera EastEnders where he played ladies' man and bad boy Danny Moon. His character first appeared on 30 December 2004 and was driven out of the show by gangster Johnny Allen seven months later. He returned to EastEnders for a brief stint in March 2006 when the character was killed off by brother Jake Moon (played by Joel Beckett) after it was revealed he had killed Dennis Rickman under Johnny Allen's orders.

In 2005, he appeared in Stars in Fast Cars.

In theatre he played Andrew in Troop and in March 2006, he toured across the UK in Kind Hearts and Coronets playing the lead character Louis Mazzini. Late 2006 saw Jake doing promotion for the department store chain Debenhams.

In May 2006, Jake played Aeneas in Dido (Queen of Carthage) for Angels in the Architecture at the Chapel of St Barnabas in Soho. This production was then revived at Kensington Palace in 2008. In the summer of 2006, Jake starred alongside ex-EastEnder, Michael Greco, in the independent thriller film Naked in London which is still awaiting an international release date. In November 2006, he starred as Mephistopheles in a modern adaptation of Doctor Faustus by Christopher Marlowe.

In 2008 he appeared in the horror film serial Beyond the Rave.

In 2009 he appeared in adverts for Littlewoods and he appeared as Sir Henry Pole for a single episode of the Showtime series, The Tudors.

In 2010, he appeared in Much Ado About Nothing in Chester's Grosvenor Park.

He appeared in The Adored by Carl Medland and Amarjeet Singh, a psychological lesbian thriller, released in 2012.

He then starred in the drama series The Royals as Prince Cyrus Henstridge.

Personal life
In a 2005 interview with Now Magazine, while he was still working on EastEnders, Maskall revealed that he was gay, and that he'd been in a relationship for 12 years, saying "it's not a secret".

Filmography
The Royals (2015) .... King Cyrus
Centurion (2010) .... Argos.
Rather You Than Me (2008)
Beyond the Rave (2008) .... Strigoi
Naked in London (2006) ....  Mark Tierney
EastEnders .... Danny Moon (2004-2005, 2006)
Murder City  (2004) .... Alan Scobie
Casualty (2002) .... Paul Vesey

References 

English male stage actors
English male soap opera actors
Actors from Essex
Living people
English gay actors
1971 births